Superman/Tarzan: Sons of the Jungle is a comic book miniseries, published in 2001.

Plot

In this story, this is a revisionist version in which Lord Greystoke grows up in England, while Kal-El is raised by the apes as "Argozan", although the two switch roles at the conclusion with Greystoke remaining in the jungle while Kal-El returns to the city, Greystoke stating in a letter to his parents that he feels as though he has found his true place.

Collected editions
The series has been collected into a trade paperback:
 Superman/Tarzan: Sons of the Jungle (Dark Horse, September 2002, 80 pages)

See also
 Batman/Tarzan: Claws of the Cat-woman
 Elseworlds

References

External links

Crossover comics
Intercompany crossovers
Elseworlds titles
Superman titles
Works based on Tarzan